Macalla seyrigalis is a species of snout moth in the genus Macalla. It was described by Hubert Marion and Pierre Viette in 1956, and is known from Madagascar and the Comoros (Mayotte and Anjouan).

References

Moths described in 1956
Epipaschiinae
Moths of Madagascar
Moths of the Comoros